Allan Ferdinand Valdez Cusi is a Filipino Admiral who served as the former Superintendent of the Philippine Military Academy after Lt. Gen. Ronnie Evangelista resigned over the hazing case and the Death of Darwin Dormitorio He is a graduate of the PMA "Sinagtala" Class of 1986.

Background 
He was born in November 17, 1964 at Quezon City, as the son of the former PMA 1962 graduate Aquilino Cusi. He entered the PMA in 1982 and graduated in 1986 as a member of the PMA Sinagtala Class of 1986.

He attended various programs in the country and abroad, such as courses at the Armed Forces of the Philippines Command and General Staff College (honor graduate award), the Naval Staff College Course (graduated with distinction), at the Naval War College, in Newport, Rhode Island,  and a graduate of Master of Science in National Resource Strategy at the Industrial College of the Armed Forces,  National Defense University in Washington, D.C., USA.

He commanded various ships and been in various commands and positions in the Philippine Navy and in the General Headquarters, Armed Forces of the Philippines. He served as the Commanding Officer of BRP Rizal (PS-74) of the Philippine Fleet and 13 other Philippine Navy vessels of various types and displacements; Charlie Company Tactical Officer at the Philippine Military Academy; Assistant Chief of Fleet Staff for Operations, F3 in the Philippine Fleet;  Director of the Naval Operations Center, Headquarters, Philippine Navy.

He was also the Director, Command Leadership and Management Division, Academic Center, at the AFP Command and General Staff College; became Chief of Academy Staff at the Philippine Military Academy, Commander of the Joint Task Force Malampaya, Commander of Naval Task Force 50, Deputy Commander of the AFP Western Command, Chief of Naval Staff of the Philippine Navy, Vice Commander of Philippine Navy and Commander of the Naval Education, Training and Doctrines Command.

He became the 81st Superintendent of the Philippine Military Academy (PMA) on October 1, 2019, after the resignation of Lieutenant General Ronnie S. Evangelista amidst the Hazing of Cadet 4th Class Darwin Dormitorio. He retired from military service on November 16, 2020, and was replaced by Lieutenant General Ferdinand M. Cartujano.

Awards and decorations 
  Philippine Republic Presidential Unit Citation
  People Power I Unit Citation
  People Power II Unit Citation
 Award of the Philippine Legion of Honor (Degree of Officer)
  Distinguished Service Stars
 Meritorious Achievement Medals
 Distinguished Service Medal
   Gawad sa Kaunlaran
   Silver Wing Medal
   Military Merit Medals
 Coast Guard Merit Medals
  Military Civic Action Medals
  Parangal sa Kapanalig ng Sandatahang Lakas ng Pilipinas
   Military Commendation Medals
  Long Service Medal
  Anti-dissidence Campaign Medal
  Luzon Anti-Dissidence Campaign Medal
  Visayas Anti-Dissidence Campaign Medal
  Mindanao Anti-Dissidence Campaign Medal
  Disaster Relief and Rehabilitation Operations Ribbon
 Kalayaan Island Group Anti-Dissidence Campaign Medal
  Combat Commander's Badge
  Naval War College Badge
  Naval Surface Warfare Badge
 Command at Sea Badge (Breast Pin)
 Philippine Navy Instructor Badge (Senior Command Instructor Badge)

Personal life

He is married, and he has 3 children.

References 

Living people
1964 births
Filipino military leaders
People from Quezon City
Philippine Military Academy alumni
Philippine Military Academy Class of 1986
Philippine Navy personnel
Recipients of the Philippine Republic Presidential Unit Citation
Recipients of the Distinguished Service Star
Recipients of the Silver Wing Medal
Recipients of the Military Merit Medal (Philippines)
Recipients of the Military Civic Action Medal
Recipients of the Military Commendation Medal
Recipients of Gawad sa Kaunlaran